Eberhard Schoener (born May 13, 1938, Stuttgart) is a German musician, composer, conductor, and arranger. His activities combine many styles and formats. Originally a classical violinist and conductor of chamber music and opera, he was one of the early adopters and popularizers of the Moog synthesizer in Europe. In the 1970s he traveled to Indonesia and incorporated musical elements from Asia into his own work. He has collaborated with rock musicians such as Jon Lord and The Police and also with Electronic Music German Pioneer band Tangerine Dream on an orchestral arrangement for the "Mojave Plan" track for a live performance on a German TV show. He has composed film scores, videos, music for television, and an opera to be broadcast via the Internet. He has won numerous awards, including the 1975 Schwabing Art Prize for music, the 1992 Bambi Award for creativity and a lifetime achievement award at the Soundtrack Cologne Festival of Music and Sound in Film and the Media in November, 2014.

Career highlights
Sources:

 1958 Studies Violin at the Academy of Music in Detmold (Nordwestdeutsche Musikakademie) under Professor Tibor Varga, chorister under Professor Eugen Pabst
 1959 Scholarship at the Accademia Musicale Chigiana in Siena, conducting class under Sergiu Celibidache and chamber music under Quintetto Chiagiano
 1960 First violin at the Bavarian State Opera House
 1961 Foundation of the Munich Juvenile Symphony Orchester, known across the borders as "The Young Orchestra (Das junge Orchester)" in the ARD TV-series.
 1964 Musical supervisor of the Bavarian Opera until 1968
 1965 Foundation of the Munich Chamber Opera and since the artistic supervisor and conductor. Amongst others he conducted annual opera and concert performances at the Brunnenhof (Fountain-Courtyard) at the Residence Castle in Munich
 1972 "Gianni Schicchi" by Giacomo Puccini as a public performance at the Olympic Games in Munich.
 1973 The chamber opera "La Zingara" for German public television (ZDF)
 1974 Collaborates with Jon Lord of Deep Purple on Windows and performance is televised also featuring David Coverdale, Glenn Hughes, and Pete York
 1974 The opera "The Chief of the Theatre (Der Schauspieldirektor)" by W.A. Mozart music supervision and directed for television, starring Peter Ustinov as well as "The Bandmaster (Der Kapellmeister)" by Cimarosa. Both were published as a record through EMI-Classic.
 1975 Conducts Hungarian Philharmonic for Sarabande album by Jon Lord of Deep Purple
 1977 The fragment of an opera "Shakuntala" by Franz Schubert for the International Dance Theatre for German public television (ZDF).
 1981 Orchestral Arrangements and Conducting of "Mojave Plan" by Tangerine Dream played with the band for German Public Television at Circus Krone Building in Munich.
 1987 "Pop-Stars perform Brecht/Weill": A concert at the Theatre of Hamburg recorded for television (NDR) featuring Sting, Gianna Nannini and Jack Bruce.
 1989 Third music-festival on the Island Elba with the performance of the opera "Mozart & Salieri".

Awards
Sources:

Discography

References

External links
 
 Eberhard Schoener Website 
 Eberhard Schoener discography with The Police & Sting
 Eberhard Schoener Website 

1938 births
21st-century German composers
21st-century German conductors (music)
21st-century German male musicians
German male composers
German male conductors (music)
Living people
Musicians from Stuttgart
The Police